The Hazāra of Muḥammad Khwāja is one of the major tribes of the ethnic Hazara inhabiting Afghanistan.

Emir Muhammad Khwaja belonged to the Barlas tribe. He was the son of Emir Haji Saifuddin who was vizier of Timur in the beginning and later became governor of Qandahar province now in Afghanistan. His great-grandfather, Hajji Beg Barlas, was leader of the Barlas tribe, who overthrew Qara'unas Abdullah from power in southern Chagatai Khanate. Abdullah, who had recently taken power, was young and inexperienced, and his move to Samarkand threatened Hajji Beg Barlas, whose territories were centered in the nearby city of Kesh.

Emir, Khan, Mirza, Beig, Shah, Ghazi, and Sultan are titles to his tribes and descendants to date. But Emir and Mirza are titles specific to his family.

Emir Muhammad Khwaja was the commander in chief of Babur’s army. He is well known as Khwaja e Bozorg ‘the great khwaja’. His names appears in many historical script including Babur Nama.

Emir was a great writer and calligrapher. This talent has also been depicted by many of his descendants in different eras such as Faiz Muhammad Kateb who served as  Afghan court chronicler and secretary to Habibullah Khan from 1901 to 1919.

Emir Muhammad Khwaja served as chief of army of Babur during his struggle to capture Delhi in each battle, including the last one in Panipat. Emir preferred the continental weather in central Asia and could never adjust to the hot weather of Delhi. It has been recorded that Emir lived in Sharan district of Paktia province and many of his descendants scattered from there to other parts of Afghanistan. 
Emir Muhammad Khwaja was buried in Sharan district of Paktia province in Afghanistan.

Emir Muhammad Khwaja had three sons: Emir Wali, Emir Babuk, and Emir Bahlool.

List of Notable Hazara of Muhammad Khwaja 
 Faiz Muhammad Kateb
 Sardar Muhammad Azim Khan
 Noor Muhammad Khan Hazara
 Abdul Wahid Sarabi
 Habiba Sarabi
 Ramazan Bashardost
 Aziz Royesh

See also 
 List of Hazara tribes
 Hazara people

References 

Hazara tribes
Hazara people
Ethnic groups in Ghazni Province
Barlas
Turkic peoples of Asia